Sir John Digby Atholl Oakeley, 8th Baronet (27 November 1932 – 19 December 2016) was a British sailor who competed in the 1972 Summer Olympics.

He began his career in the 1950s, winning the Merlin Rocket championship three times and the National 12 once. In addition, he was the winner of the Flying Dutchman World Championship in 1967.

Oakeley also wrote two books on sailing, Winning and This is Downwind Sailing. He died on 19 December 2016 at the age of 84.

References

External links
 
 
 
 

1932 births
2016 deaths
Baronets in the Baronetage of Great Britain
British male sailors (sport)
Olympic sailors of Great Britain
Sailors at the 1972 Summer Olympics – Soling
Flying Dutchman class world champions
World champions in sailing for Great Britain